USS Normandy (CG-60) is a Ticonderoga-class guided-missile cruiser in the service of the United States Navy. Armed with naval guns and anti-air, anti-surface, and anti-submarine missiles, plus other weapons, she is equipped for surface-to-air, surface-to-surface, and anti-submarine warfare. The cruiser was the first US warship since 1945 to go to war on her maiden cruise, and in 1998 was awarded the title "Most Tomahawks shot by a U.S. Navy Cruiser". She is named for the World War II Battle of Normandy, which took place in France on, and following, D-Day.

Construction
Normandy was laid down at Bath Iron Works, Bath, Maine, on 7 April 1987, launched on 19 March 1988, and commissioned on 9 December 1989. She is homeported in Norfolk, Virginia.

Service history

Gulf War
Just one year after her commissioning in Newport, Rhode Island, Normandy sailed into action in order to support the multinational effort to free Kuwait. Normandy and her crew left on 28 December 1990 to join United Nations forces conducting Operations Desert Shield and Desert Storm. As part of the  Battle Group, Normandy transited the Suez Canal and the Red Sea on her way to the Persian Gulf. Normandy fired 26 Tomahawk cruise missiles, protected allied ships and aircraft in the area, conducted maritime interdiction operations, and helped to locate and destroy enemy mines. She was the first US warship since 1945 to go to war on her maiden cruise.

Adriatic Operations
On 11 August 1995, Normandy and the  Battle Group deployed to the Adriatic Sea in support of United Nations efforts with the war-torn Federal Republic of Yugoslavia. Normandys primary duty was Adriatic air-space controller for Operations Provide Promise, Deny Flight, and Sharp Guard.

50th Anniversary of D-Day
In an historic first, Normandy embarked nine World War II veterans on 18 May 1994, for commemoration of the 50th anniversary of the Allied landings on the coast of France. These activities took place in Portsmouth, England, until 31 May, ending in Le Havre, France. Over 15,000 visitors toured the ship while Normandys honor guard embarked veterans participated in various memorial services and events on both sides of the English Channel. Normandy served as a centerpiece over the two-week course of ceremonies, and specifically for national commemorations at Slapton Sands, United Kingdom, on 31 May, by U.S. Ambassador Crowe, and at the Normandy beachheads on 6 June, by President Bill Clinton.

On 27 June 1994, Normandy participated in the Naval Station New York closing ceremonies. Staten Island's Borough President, Guy Molinari, and his daughter Congresswoman Susan Molinari were the featured speakers as the Navy turned the base over to the city's Emergency Services. After four years homeported at Staten Island, New York, Normandy departed for her new homeport of Norfolk, Virginia.

Operation Deliberate Force

On 28 August 1995, Normandy began a six-month deployment to the Mediterranean with America. On 8 September, Normandy was in the Western Mediterranean conducting turnover with the outgoing battle group. Arriving in the Operation Deliberate Force theater of operations on 10 September, Normandy launched a 13 Tomahawk missile strike against hostile air defense command and control sites in Lisina, Bosnia-Herzegovina, north of the Bosnian Serb stronghold of Banja Luka, between 20:40 and 20:45. The cruiser used a new type of Tomahawk missile, the Block-III model, which included for the first time GPS guidance in combination with its TERCOM system based on topographic maps. This gave flexibility and speed to the attack. This precision strike, flawlessly executed on extremely short notice, paved the way for follow-on tactical air strikes against Bosnian Serb military positions in the region. This action sent a strong signal of United States resolve and played a significant role in convincing the Bosnian Serb government to cease hostilities and resume peace negotiations. During the six-month deployment Normandy again served as Adriatic air-space controller for Operation Deny Flight, Sharp Guard, and Decisive Endeavor.

Exercise Bright Star and Operation Southern Watch
On 3 October 1997, Normandy once again began a six-month deployment, this time as Air Defense Commander of the  battle group. Throughout the month of October, Normandy participated, along with 27 other international units, in Exercise Bright Star off the Egyptian coast. Upon completion of Bright Star, Normandy was directed to proceed at best speed to the Persian Gulf.

Beginning 16 November, Normandy, along with other units of the George Washington battle group, transited the Suez Canal, Red Sea, Gulf of Oman, and Arabian Sea. In a record-setting five days, Normandy and George Washington entered the Persian Gulf and joined the  Battle Group in an impressive show of force and United Nation resolve to Iraq. Normandy immediately assumed duties as the "Ready Strike" platform in the Gulf and, later, also assumed duties as the air-defense commander for the entire Persian Gulf. For four months Normandy patrolled the Gulf in support of Operation Southern Watch. During this time, she conducted several successful maritime-interception operations along with her strike and air-defense duties.

Underway for the holidays, Normandy hosted pop singer Paula Cole on 23 December. On Christmas morning, it hosted Chief of Naval Operations Admiral Jay L. Johnson, his wife, and Master Chief Petty Officer of the Navy ETCM John Hagan. George Washingtons battle group was relieved by the  Battle Group in the Persian Gulf, and Normandy returned to her homeport of Norfolk on 3 April 1998. Normandy finished a major overhaul period in Norfolk Naval Shipyard on 28 February.

Miscellaneous Activities
A major fuel oil fire erupted from the ship's Forward Fire Room into the ship's superstructure, isolating the crew forward and aft. Fire crews from the Normandy boarded Conyngham via small boat transfer and were instrumental in extinguishing the fire.

On 21 June 2000, Normandy and the George Washington Battle Group deployed to the Mediterranean and the Arabian Sea. On 19 December, Normandy returned to Norfolk just in time for the holidays.

On 20 June 2002, Normandy left the US East Coast on deployment. Again assigned to the George Washington Battle Group, Normandy returned to Norfolk in December 2002.

In 2003, the ship was assigned to Cruiser-Destroyer Group 2.

On 25 March 2005, Normandy left the East Coast with the assault ship  ESG, deployed to the Mediterranean and Northern Persian Gulf.  Normandy returned to Norfolk in October 2005.

In April 2007, Normandy deployed on her 7-month NATO cruise. The ship's crew was awarded the Article 5 NATO Medal. She returned on Halloween after 200 days of showing the flag, in the process becoming the first ship to circumnavigate Africa. On this cruise, sailors on board earned their Bluenose and Emerald Shellback.

On 13 January 2010, Normandy was ordered to assist in humanitarian efforts following the 2010 Haiti earthquake.

On 20 May 2010, Normandy deployed to the Persian Gulf for a seven-month deployment. It returned on 12 December 2010, on a bitterly cold, snowy day.

In 2012, Normandy deployed for two months to the Baltic Sea in support of diplomatic relations in regards to BaltOps 2012 and FRUKUS 2012 (France, Russia, United Kingdom, and United States).

On 9 February 2020 while patrolling in the Arabian Sea, Normandy captured a stateless dhow carrying a cargo of 358 missiles, Iranian surface-to-air missiles.

Awards
Normandy received the Navy Unit Commendation, the National Defense Service Medal, and the Southwest Asia Service Medal (with two bronze stars) for her efforts in support of Operations Desert Shield and Desert Storm. She was awarded her second Navy Unit Commendation Medal in June 1994, for her extensive participation in events commemorating D-Day. Normandy was awarded her third Navy Unit Commendation and the Meritorious Unit Commendation for her actions during her time in the Adriatic. In 1997, she won the Marjorie Sterrett Battleship Fund Award for the Atlantic Fleet.

Along with the 1998 title "Most Tomahawks shot by a US Navy cruiser", Normandy holds three Battle "E" Awards for overall ship-wide excellence in performance.

Coat of arms

Shield 

The lettering, lion, anchor, and perimeter of the shield are gold. The border beneath the lettering and the crest background are dark blue. These are the color traditionally associated with the Navy. The caltraps symbolize mines and German defenses on the Normandy beaches. The anchor characterizes sea power and strength. The chevron is broken and thrust forward, denoting the assault landing and the "breaking through" the enemy defenses; it is white for honor and integrity, edged with red for valor, sacrifice, and bloodshed.

Crest 
The pole star signifies the Allied Forces that joined for the Normandy Invasion. It also portrays the four points of the globe, signifying the worldwide mission of the Normandy. The gold lion, adopted from the Coat of Arms of Normandy, France, represents the location of the assault and characterizes the courage, strength, and determination of the invasion forces. He grasps an inflamed trident in honor of Neptune, mythological lord of the sea, and code name for the Navy's crucial gunfire support and the delivery of land forces in the Battle of Normandy.

Motto 
The words, "VANGUARD OF VICTORY," underscore the Battle of Normandy as the spearhead of the Allied defense which turned the tide of war in Europe, as well as the leading role of the AEGIS cruiser in today's world as a defender of world freedom.

References

External links

 Official web site
 USS Normandy webpage

 

Ticonderoga-class cruisers
Ships built in Bath, Maine
1988 ships
Gulf War ships of the United States
Cold War cruisers of the United States
Cruisers of the United States
2010 Haiti earthquake relief
Military units and formations of the Bosnian War